Weli-Ahmed Hakim (né Hakimoff; Хакимов; July 27, 1882 – November 28, 1970) was a Tatar founding member and a long-time imam of The Finnish-Islamic Congregation. Hakim also operated as imam in Tampere. Hakim was a key figure in organizing religious gatherings before a Tatar congregation was established. Hakim is also mentioned as a major contributor in helping Islamic theologians and Idel-Ural State refugees in Finland.

Biography 
Weli-Ahmed Hakim (Wäliäxmät Xäkim) was born on July 27, 1882. He was from Russia, Nizhny Novgorod Governorate, a Tatar village named Olı Rbişça (Russian: Bolshoye Rybushkino). Hakim moved to Finland in 1914 and acquired a citizenship in 1926.

Hakim was a founding member of the Helsinki-based Tatar congregation, The Finnish-Islamic Congregation, and for decades operated as its main imam. The local Tatar community invited Hakim after the previous imam, Semiulla Sadretdinoff moved to Turku. Hakim got his imam's training in Ufa. He had also studied in Medina and Mecca. Before his vocation in Finland, Hakim was the imam in Kasimov and also for example worked as a teacher in Moscow.

The predecessor to the Tatar congregation, Suomen musulmaanien hyväntekeväisyysseura (1915, Eng. The Finnish Mohammedan Charity Club) at first organized their gatherings at the home of Hakim in Helsinki. The main building of The Finnish-Islamic Congregation was completed in 1961 and is located on a street called Fredrikinkatu.

Hakim operated as the imam of the congregation until 1962. His successor was Ahmet Naim Atasever. He was also the imam for the Tatars of Tampere, until Habiburrahman Shakir started in 1947. For a while, Hakim also performed his services in Estonia. Hakim designed the Arabic texts for the Finnish Tatar tombstones.

Hakim was also known for teaching the children of his community and in 1939 publishing a work called Türk balalarınıñ din deslerı I-II (Eng. The religious textbooks of Turkish children). Hakim was aligned with Pan-Turkism. When referring to his community, he avoided the term ”Tatar” and rather identified them as ”Turks”. (turkkilainen in Finnish).

Hakim has been named as the honorary member of The Finnish-Islamic Congregation. In addition to his work as an imam, he had a major contribution in helping the Islamic theologians and Idel-Ural State leaders when they came to Finland, as well as fellow Mishars arriving from Nizhny Novgorod Oblast. Hakim was in close contact with Jadidists visiting the country. Hakim has been called a talented speaker, who recited the Quran with a melodic voice.

Weli-Ahmed Hakim died in Helsinki on November 28, 1970. His spouse was Aliye Hakim (née Sadri) and children Nazime, Nadiye, Ilhamiye, Kadriye and Fuad.

Name versions 
Weli-Ahmed Hakim, Veli Ahmet Hakim, Vali Ahmed Abdulhakimov, Valiahmet Hakimov, Ahmet Hakimoff, W. Hakimoff.

In Literary Tatar, the name is Вәлиәхмәт Хәким, Wäliäxmät Xäkim/Wəliəxmət Xəkim.

Citations and references

Cited sources 
 Muazzez Baibulat: The Tampere Islamic Congregation: the roots and history. Gummerus Kirjapaino Oy 2004, Jyväskylä. .
 Tervonen, Miikka & Leinonen Johanna (toim.): Vähemmistöt muuttajina - Näkökulmia suomalaisen muuttoliikehistorian moninaisuuteen. Painosalama Oy, Turku 2021. ISBN 978-952-7399-09-5.

Further reading
 Our Religious Mentor: Musa Bigeev and the Tatars in Finland - Islam Zaripov, Ramil Belyaev

1882 births
1970 deaths
Finnish Tatars
Imams